Katrín Fjeldsted (born November 6, 1946) is an Icelandic politician and medical doctor. She has been a member of Reykjavik city council and a member of parliament at Iceland's Althingi. She was elected to Iceland's Constitutional Assembly in 2010. She has been the chairman of the Icelandic College of Family Physicians and was the President of the Standing Committee of European Doctors from 2013 until 2015.

Biography 

Fjeldsted finished her A levels in 1966, qualified in medicine at the University of Iceland in 1973 and finished specific training in family medicine in London in 1979 and has been a practicing family doctor in Iceland since then. She married Valgarður Egilsson, also a doctor, in 1967. They have had four children, three of whom are alive, and 6 grandchildren. Fjeldsted's mother is Icelandic classical composer Jórunn Viðar and her father was merchant Lárus Fjeldsted.

Politics 

Fjeldsted was a member of Reykjvík city council for the Independence Party from 1982 to 1994, and of the city executive council 1986–1994. She was a member of parliament 1999-2003 for Reykjavik constituency, and deputy member 1995-1999 and 2003–2007.

Fjeldsted was Chairman of the Icelandic College of Family Physicians 1995–1999, Member of Board of the Icelandic Medical Association 1997–1999, Head of the Icelandic delegation to CPME since 2000, elected CPME Vice President for 2006-2007 and 2008-2009 and elected treasurer 2010–2012.

Fjeldsted has been President of CPME (Standing Committee of European Doctors) since January 1, 2013.

References

External links
 Biography of Katrín Fjeldsted at Iceland's Althingi (in Icelandic)
 Biography of Katrín Fjeldsted at CPME's homepage

1946 births
Katrin Fjeldsted
Katrin Fjeldsted
Katrin Fjeldsted
Living people
Katrin Fjeldsted
Katrin Fjeldsted
Icelandic women in politics